Parker Wotherspoon (born August 24, 1997) is a Canadian professional ice hockey defenceman for the  New York Islanders of the National Hockey League (NHL). He was selected by the Islanders in the fourth round, 112th overall, at the 2015 NHL Entry Draft. Wotherspoon played four seasons of junior hockey for the Western Hockey League (WHL)'s Tri-City Americans.

Playing career
Wotherspoon was drafted by the New York Islanders in the fourth round, 112th overall, of the 2015 NHL Entry Draft.

On May 2, 2016, the Islanders signed Wotherspoon to a three-year, entry-level contract. On October 27, 2020, he signed a two-year contract extension with the team. Wotherspoon made his NHL debut on December 23, 2022, playing for 14:47 minutes while recording two shots on goal and one hit in the Islanders' 5–1 win against the Florida Panthers.

Personal life
Wotherspoon is the brother of Tyler Wotherspoon, who was selected 57th overall by the Calgary Flames.

Career statistics

Regular season and playoffs

International

Awards and honours

References

External links
 

1997 births
Living people
Bridgeport Islanders players
Bridgeport Sound Tigers players
Canadian ice hockey defencemen
New York Islanders draft picks
New York Islanders players
Ice hockey people from British Columbia
Sportspeople from Surrey, British Columbia
Tri-City Americans players